Vana is a town and minor former Rajput minor princely state on Saurashtra peninsula in Gujarat, western India.

History 
Vadal was a non-salute princely state in Jhalawar prant, comprising Vana and two other villages, under Jhala Rajput Chieftains.

It had a population of 2,749 in 1901, yielding a state revenue of 26,000 Rupees (all from land; 1903–4) and paying 3,993 Rupees tribute to the Junagarh State.

During the British Raj, the petty state was under the colonial Eastern Kathiawar Agency.

External links 
 DSAL.UChicago - Kathiawar

Princely states of Gujarat
Rajput princely states